Trachelophora curvicollis is a species of beetle in the family Cerambycidae. It was described by Perroud in 1855. It is known from Malaysia, Java, and Sumatra.

References

Homonoeini
Beetles described in 1855